Yvan Keller (December 13, 1960 – September 22, 2006), nicknamed The Pillow Killer, was a French serial killer. Between 1989 and 2006, he killed at least 23 people in France, Switzerland and Germany, and confessed to killing about 150. If corroborated, that would make him the most prolific French serial killer of the 20th century.

Biography

Childhood 
Yvan Keller was born on December 13, 1960, in Wittenheim, Haut-Rhin. His parents were basket makers and sedentary travellers who had 8 other children, all of them living on Bourg Street. His father, Joseph, was employed in Alsace's potash mines. Keller grew up in a rather unstable family, as his father forced him to work hard so they could survive. His mother died at age 49.

This busy life took Yvan behind bars at the age of 17 for stealing two antiques in Battenheim in 1981. Keller was arrested and sentenced to 10 years in prison for robbery.

The man with two faces 
In August 1989, Keller was released. He moved to Mulhouse on Verdun Street, in the apartment of an old mansion in a quiet and green area, away from the city center. He became a landscape gardener and created a small company: Alsa-Jardin. His clients were very satisfied with his work and frequently recommended him. He led a modest life, living with a woman named Marina, but they later separated and he found a new companion named Séverine.

Keller's neighbors said that he was very helpful, friendly and affectionate with animals.

Marina, Keller's first companion, said he had forced her into prostitution because he was in constant need of money because of his love for luxury, casinos, horse racing, great restaurants and big-name hotels. One of his friends said that while he was in relationship with his second wife Séverine, she was already in a relationship with another man. When he learned of this, Keller went to see the man and put a gun in his mouth, threatening him to leave his wife alone.

So, there were two faces of Yvan Keller: for his neighbors and colleagues, he was "everybody's gentleman", while for his family, he was a ruthless and angry man.

Murders and subsequent investigation 
In January 1994, at Burnhaupt-le-Haut, Basse Street resident Marie Winterholer was found dead in her bed, lying on her back. The doctor concluded that it was a natural death and issued a license to bury.

On March 12, 1994, at 11 Basse Street, a man named Germain had decided to visit his 86-year-old mother, Ernestine Mang. Just behind the door, he was surprised to find an old butter churn, which had been stored in the house's cellar for years. He then found his mother dead in bed, lying on her back. He was surprised that the bedding was flawlessly drawn, because Ernestine had trouble moving due to hip problems. Because of this, Germain was convinced that it wasn't her who had moved the churn.

On April 27, 1994, at 22 Basse Street, 77-year-old Augusta Wassmer was also found dead in her bed, lying on her back. No break-in was observed, but her daughter Marie-Françoise Roecklin found that the bed was too well done. The autopsy concluded with a death by cardiac arrest, probably "due to great fear". Later, Marie-Françoise noticed that Augusta's bank card and a key to the house had disappeared, and that the card had been used in Mulhouse to make three withdrawals.

After his arrest, Keller acknowledged the murders of 150 people.

Yvan Keller was implicated in 23 murders of old ladies, but is suspected of having killed 40.

As a landscape gardener, Keller could easily locate the houses of his victims. He killed old people so he could steal their valuables, such as money, paintings and jewels, which he would later sell to junk dealers. He would repeat the same scenario each time: he stifled his victims in their bed, then remade the bed to perfection so it would look like a natural death.

Arrest 
Between 1993 and 2003, Yvan Keller was denounced 3 times, but the first two did not follow through. The third, after 3 years of investigation, led to his arrest. Keller quickly confessed, advancing the number of victims to 150, admitting to have been active in Alsace, Switzerland and Germany. He was only indicted for five deaths: three in Haut-Rhin in 1994 and two in Bas-Rhin. Eight murders, now investigated, could have completed the list, with investigators finding similarities in other cases as well.

Death 
On September 22, 2006, Yvan Keller committed suicide at the Mulhouse High Court. He killed himself using his shoelaces, intertwining them to form a rope that he inserted into the neon of one of the court jails. His last words were "I just wanted to be loved."

In other media

Press articles 
 "Behind a suicide, the shadow of old ladies killed" Article published on September 26, 2006 in Libération.
 « Mulhouse. Il s'accusait d'une trentaine de crimes » Article published on September 27, 2006 in La Dépêche du Midi.
 « Sur les traces du tueur de vieilles dames » Article by Jean-Marc Ducos and Jean-François  Frey published on September 27, 2006 in Le Parisien.
 « Les gendarmes ne nous ont pas pris au sérieux » Article published on September 27, 2006 in Le Parisien.
 « Mulhouse : Keller, tueur du siècle ? » Article published on October 4, 2006 in Le Nouvel observateur.
 « Yvan Keller aurait fait 23 » Article by Jean-Marc Ducos and François Vignolle published on April 25, 2007 in Le Parisien.
 « Mise en examen de deux complices du "tueur aux vieilles dames" » Article published on October 3, 2008 in Le Parisien.
 « La compagne d'un tueur en série indemnisée » Article published on May 20, 2009 in L'Express.
 « Keller se pend après s'être accusé de trente meurtres » Article by Yolande Baldeweck published on January 25, 2010 in Le Figaro.
 « L'homme qui s'accusait de 150 meurtres... » Article published on February 5, 2012 in L'Alsace.
 « Serial killer ? » Article published on February 17, 2012 in Dernières Nouvelles d'Alsace.
 « Tueur de vieilles dames : pas d’erreur du tribunal » Article published on February 25, 2012 in Le Républicain lorrain.
 « Il killer che dava la morte migliore » Article published on August 3, 2017 in Corriere della Sera.

TV documentaries 
 "Yvan Keller: the Pillow Killer" on October 5 and 15, November 26 and 30, December 12 and 17, 2010 in Affaires criminelles on NT1, then on Toute l'Histoire.
 "The Keller case, the killer in the pillow" December 22, 2010 in Criminal Investigations: The Magazine of News Items on W9 rebroadcast in Dossiers criminels on Numéro 23.
 "The killer committed suicide" (first report) in Strasbourg on June 10, 17, 25 and 29, 2013, May 5, 12 and 20, 2014 in Crimes on NRJ 12.

Radio broadcasts 
 "The Yvan Keller case" on February 17, 2012, and "Yvan Keller, the killer in the pillow", June 5, 2013 in The Crime Hour by Jacques Pradel on RTL.

See also
 List of serial killers by country
 List of serial killers by number of victims

Notes and references 

1960 births
2006 suicides
French people who died in prison custody
French serial killers
Male serial killers
Pages with unreviewed translations
People charged with murder
People from Haut-Rhin
Prisoners who died in French detention
Serial killers who committed suicide in prison custody
Suicides by hanging in France